"Browns Station" may refer to:

 Brown's Station, New York, a village submerged by the Ashokan Reservoir
 Brown's Railroad Station, a railroad depot that served the village
 Brown's Station, former name for the community of Browns, Boone County, Missouri
 Brown's Station, former name for the community of Browns, Ohio in Preble County

See also
 Brown Station, an Argentine Antarctic base and research station